Top-seeded Manuela Maleeva was the defending champion but fell in the quarterfinals to Kate Gompert.
Fourth-seed Andrea Temesvári claimed the title and $38,000 first prize money by defeating Zina Garrison in the final.

Seeds
The top eight seeds received a bye into the second round. A champion seed is indicated in bold text while text in italics indicates the round in which that seed was eliminated.

  Manuela Maleeva (quarterfinals)
  Zina Garrison (final)
  Gabriela Sabatini (semifinals)
  Andrea Temesvári (champion)
  Pam Casale (second round)
  Kathy Horvath (third round)
  Michelle Torres (third round)
  Katerina Maleeva (third round)
  Lisa Bonder (first round)
  Terry Phelps (second round)
  Sabrina Goleš (third round)
  Susan Mascarin (third round)
  Debbie Spence (quarterfinals)
  Raffaella Reggi (quarterfinals)

Draw

Finals

Top half

Section 1

Section 2

Bottom half

Section 3

Section 4

References

External links

U.S. Clay Court Championships
1985 U.S. Clay Court Championships